Troy Nickerson is a collegiate national champion wrestler from New York.

Nickerson attended Chenango Forks High School. At Chenango Forks, Nickerson became the first five-time High School state champion (Div I) of New York and amassed a record of 217-6 while winning several junior national championships.  He was so dominant as a schoolboy that Intermat named him the ninth best high school wrestler for the entire 20-year period ending in 2005.  At the Fargo tournament, the most prestigious schoolboy wrestling event in the U.S., he captured five titles in six tries.

After graduating from high school Nickerson attended Cornell University, where he won three EIWA wrestling titles and was a rare four-time All-American. In his junior year, Nickerson won the 2009 NCAA wrestling title at 125 pounds. He finished 2nd as a true freshman, 3rd as a sophomore, and 4th as a senior with a total career record of 97-8. He served as captain during his senior year and was a member of the Quill and Dagger society.

In September 2010, Nickerson accepted a position as an assistant coach for the Finger Lakes Wrestling Club of New York, which focuses on promoting all levels of wrestling in New York State.

In 2011 and 2012, Nickerson competed in freestyle with his goal of making the U.S. Olympic team.  He did not qualify for the Olympic Trials.  In 2012, he was hired as an assistant coach at Iowa State. In 2014, Nickerson was named head coach of the University of Northern Colorado program.

External links
 Career Stats
 WIN Magazine article
 

Living people
American wrestlers
Cornell University alumni
American wrestling coaches
Sportspeople from Binghamton, New York
Year of birth missing (living people)